Albert Rose (30 March 1910 – 26 July 1990) was an American physicist, who made major contributions to TV video camera tubes such as the orthicon, image orthicon, and vidicon.

Biography
He received an A.B. degree and a Ph.D. degree in Physics from Cornell University in 1931 and 1935, respectively.  He joined RCA, where was active in the development of TV camera tubes.

Rose was an expert on photoconductivity. He wrote a book "Concepts in photoconductivity and allied problems", which was published by John Wiley & Sons, New York in 1963.

He also did research on the visibility of objects in a noisy signal, such as from TV tubes. He found that humans could distinguish small objects in noisy images at near 100% accuracy if the object brightness differed from the background by at least 5 times the noise standard deviation; this signal-to-noise relationship is known as the Rose criterion.

Rose also originated the concept of detective quantum efficiency, today widely used in optical and X-ray imaging.

He died in 1990.

US patents

  Photoconductor for imaging devices
  Pickup tube target
  Method of reproducing an electrostatic charge pattern in intensified form

Honors and awards

 Member, National Academy of Engineering in 1975
 IEEE (Institute of Electrical and Electronics Engineers) Edison Medal in 1979
 IEEE Morris N. Liebmann Award
 SMPTE (Society of Motion Picture and Television Engineers) David Sarnoff Gold Medal Award
 Fellow, IEEE
 Fellow, American Physical Society

References

External links
 IEEE Global History Network bio with photo

1910 births
1990 deaths
20th-century American physicists
Fellow Members of the IEEE
IEEE Edison Medal recipients
Cornell University alumni
Deaths from lung cancer